is a Japanese manga series written and illustrated by Yasuhiro Kanō. It has been serialized on Shueisha's Shōnen Jump+ online platform since February 2020, with its chapters collected into five tankōbon volumes as of September 2022.

Synopsis
Aoi Nemo is a medical genius and prodigy who has invented useful equipment and has had his work published in magazines. While he is suave and debonair in public, he longs for love and fears that his work will prevent him from achieving it. One day he meets Kiruru Akaumi and falls madly in love with her. Unfortunately, he is unable to speak directly to her unless it is in a planned business or social affair. When he learns that she is an assassin, he decides to hire her to assassinate himself so that he can freely "converse" with her; using his genius medical skills to save himself should he be close to death.

Publication
Kiruru Kill Me, written and illustrated by Yasuhiro Kanō, started its serialization on Shueisha's online magazine Shōnen Jump+ on February 23, 2020. Shueisha has collected its chapters into individual tankōbon volumes. The first volume was released on June 4, 2020. As of September 2, 2022, five volumes have been released. In July 2022, it was announced that the manga would enter on an indefinite hiatus.

In May 2021, Seven Seas Entertainment announced that they had licensed the manga for English release in North America in both physical and digital format starting on October 12, 2021.

Volume list

References

Further reading

External links
 

2020 webcomic debuts
Action anime and manga
Japanese webcomics
Romantic comedy anime and manga
Seven Seas Entertainment titles
Shōnen manga
Shueisha manga
Webcomics in print